This page lists the winners and nominees for the Soul Train Music Award for Best R&B/Soul or Rap Dance Cut, also called the Sprite Award. This award was only given between the years 2005 and 2007.

Winners and nominees
Winners are listed first and highlighted in bold.

2000s

References

Soul Train Music Awards